Maryia Filonchyk (born 10 January 1992) is a Belarusian basketball player. She represented Belarus in the Basketball competition at the 2016 Summer Olympics

References

External links
Profile at eurobasket.com
Profile FIBA

1992 births
Living people
People from Babruysk
Power forwards (basketball)
Belarusian women's basketball players
Olympic basketball players of Belarus
Basketball players at the 2016 Summer Olympics
Belarusian expatriate basketball people in Russia
Belarusian expatriate basketball people in Montenegro
Sportspeople from Mogilev Region